Omm ol Sakhar or Omm os Sakhar or Omm-os-saxr may refer to:
 Omm ol Sakhar, Ramshir
 Omm ol Sakhar, Shadegan

See also
 Zeyl Omm os Sakhar